Jiao may refer to:

Horn (Chinese constellation), or Jiao (角宿), a Chinese constellation 
Jiaolong, or Jiao (蛟), a Chinese dragon
Jiao (currency) (角),  a unit of currency in China, one-tenth of a Chinese yuan or dollar
Jiao (surname) (焦), a Chinese surname
Jiao River (Shandong), in Shandong, China
Jiao River (Zhejiang), in Zhejiang, China
Jiao, a Chinese form of litter (vehicle)

Mythology
Lady Jiao, also known as Fubao